Montecastelli Pisano is a village in Tuscany, central Italy, administratively a frazione of the comune of Castelnuovo di Val di Cecina, province of Pisa. At the time of the 2001 census its population was 188.

References 

Frazioni of the Province of Pisa